Gianluca Falsini (born 2 October 1975 in Arezzo) is an Italian football manager and former player, who played as a defender. He last played for Legnago Salus, and formerly also played in Serie A for Verona, Parma, Atalanta, Reggina, Siena and Catania.

Playing career
Born in Arezzo, Tuscany region, Falsini started his career at Parma of Emilia-Romagna region. In 1995, he was farmed to Gualdo, Monza and Padova before being signed by Verona in 1998, where he won promotion to Serie A in 1999. In 2000, he returned to Parma of Serie A. In January 2000 he was loaned to Atalanta of Serie A after just playing 6 league matches in the season. In 2002, he left for Reggina of Serie A on loan for 2 seasons. In 2004, he signed a 3-year contract with Siena. In August 2006, he signed a 3-year contract with Catania. and released in November 2007.

In January 2008, he returned to his hometown club Arezzo. In August 2008, he signed a contract with Padova winning the promotion playoffs. In March 2010, he signed a contract with Legnago Salus.

References

External links

Italian footballers
Parma Calcio 1913 players
A.S. Gualdo Casacastalda players
A.C. Monza players
Calcio Padova players
Hellas Verona F.C. players
Atalanta B.C. players
Reggina 1914 players
A.C.N. Siena 1904 players
Catania S.S.D. players
S.S. Arezzo players
Serie A players
Serie B players
Serie C players
Association football defenders
Sportspeople from Arezzo
1975 births
Living people
Footballers from Tuscany